Schlewecke, in Oker dialect: Sleiwecke is a village that forms a part (Stadtteil) of Bad Harzburg in the district of Goslar in Lower Saxony, Germany. As of 31 December 2020, Schlewecke had a population of 1,667.

Geography 
The district is located between Bündheim to the southeast, Göttingerode to the west, Harlingerode to the northwest and Westerode to the northeast.

History

Etymology 
Schlewecke was first mentioned in 1147 as Sleueken and in 1180 as Sclivede. The suffix Schle- stems from a Proto-Germanic root *slaihwō and cognates to German Schlehe and English Sloe. The prefix either means "creek" or cognates to English -th, as in "wealth", "strength". Other names were Slevedhe and '
'Slyofede.

 Timeline 
Schlewecke was always an unimportant village of farmers and woodcutters. The recent church was built in 1708.

On January 1, 1963, the community of Schlewecke merged with Bündheim to Bündheim-Schlewecke'', that again became part of Bad Harzburg on July 1, 1972.

Gallery

References 

Goslar (district)
Bad Harzburg